The land of Uz ( – ʾereṣ-ʿŪṣ) is a location mentioned in the Old Testament, most prominently in the Book of Job, which begins, "There was a man in the land of Uz, whose name was Job". 

The name "Uz" is used most often to refer to Uz, son of Aram, presumably the region's namesake. He is mentioned repeatedly in the Bible, in the books of Genesis and 1 Chronicles. It is most often theorized that the Land of Uz is located in either Aram, Edom, or both.

Location
It has been long debated if Uz is either Aram or Edom. In the Bible, Genesis 10:23, Genesis 22:21 and 1 Chronicles 1:42 mention Aram, son of Shem, whose firstborn son is named Uz. Rashi also holds this view. See Rashi's comment on Job 1:1. According to the  War Scroll, one of the Dead Sea Scrolls, the land of Uz existed beyond the Euphrates, possibly in relation to Aram. In Column 2 verse 11, it is noted, "they shall fight against the rest of the sons of Aramea: Uz, Hul, Togar, and Mesha, who are beyond the Euphrates." Edom was roughly in the area of modern-day southwestern Jordan and southern Israel. Lamentations 4:21 reads: "Rejoice and be glad, O daughter of Edom, that dwellest in the land of Uz." According to the Book of Job, Job lived "in the land of Uz". Job has often been identified as the Jobab mentioned in Genesis 36:33, king of Edom and great-grandson of Esau. However, it is more likely that the "Land of Uz" simply covered both Edom and Aram.

Other locations
Other locations proposed for Uz include more southern Arabia, especially Dhofar, said to be the home of the original Arabs; Bashan in modern-day southern Syria/western Jordan; Arabia east of Petra, Jordan; and even modern-day Uzbekistan.

Other interpretations
Some scholars hold that Uz is a fictional place to serve the story of Job, rather than a physical land.  The word Uz in Hebrew means "counsel" or "advice", which here suggests that this story takes place in the "Land of Counsel". This fits the story, as the remainder of the book is a story about a man named Job who wrestles with his suffering, and is counseled by several men, and ultimately God. A similar conjecture is that if Uz was a physical place, it may have been chosen as the setting for the story due to the meaning of its name.

In popular culture
In 20th-century Israel, when The Wizard of Oz was translated to Hebrew, the translator of the film's subtitles chose to use Land of Uz for the book's Land of Oz. In addition, Avraham Shlonsky's musical adaptation of the Brothers Grimm fairytale Rumpelstiltskin, in addition to naming the titular character Uz-li-Guz-li, is explicitly stated to be set in the Land of Uz. Thus, to modern Hebrew readers, "Land of Uz" assumed a new layer of meanings unrelated to its Biblical ones.

References 

Hebrew Bible regions